Vaal Professionals were a South African football (soccer) club. Based in Vereeniging, they were a founder member of the Premier Soccer League in 1996. They were nicknamed Setla or Vaal Monsters.

Honours
NPSL League Champions: 3
1986, 1987, 1988
Bob Save Super Bowl: 1
1994

References

Association football clubs established in 1970
Defunct soccer clubs in South Africa
Vereeniging
Former Premier Soccer League clubs
Soccer clubs in Gauteng
1970 establishments in South Africa